Statistics of North American Soccer League in season 1970. This was the 3rd season of the NASL.

Overview
Six teams competed with the Rochester Lancers winning the championship. Santos FC of Brazil beat the NASL All-Stars  4–3 at Soldier Field in Chicago to finish the season. In 1970, NASL teams rounded out their schedules by playing an assortment of foreign clubs including Hapoel Petah Tikva, Varzim, Hertha Berlin and Coventry City. These games weren't just for attendance but also counted in the standings. The Washington Darts went 2-2-0 versus the international teams earning the "International Cup".

Changes from the previous season

New teams
Rochester Lancers*
Washington Darts*
*joined from American Soccer League

Teams folding
Baltimore Bays

Teams moving
None

Name changes
None

Regular season
W = Wins, L = Losses, T= Ties, GF = Goals For, GA = Goals Against, PT= point system

6 points for a win, 
3 points for a tie,
0 points for a loss,
1 point for each goal scored up to three per game.
-Premiers (most points). -Other playoff team.

NASL All-Stars

NASL Final 1970

First leg

Second leg

1970 NASL Champions: Rochester Lancers

Post season awards
Most Valuable Player: Carlos Metidieri, Rochester
Coach of the year: Sal DeRosa, Rochester
Rookie of the year: Jim Leeker, St. Louis

References

 
North American Soccer League (1968–1984) seasons
1970 in American soccer leagues
North American Soccer League